Dambisa Felicia Moyo, Baroness Moyo (born 2 February 1969) is a Zambian-born economist and author, known for her analysis of macroeconomics and global affairs. She has written five books, including four New York Times bestsellers: Dead Aid: Why Aid Is Not Working and How There Is a Better Way for Africa (2009), How the West Was Lost: Fifty Years of Economic Folly – And the Stark Choices that Lie Ahead (2011), Winner Take All: China's Race for Resources and What It Means for the World (2012), Edge of Chaos: Why Democracy Is Failing to Deliver Economic Growth – and How to Fix It (2018), and How Boards Work: And How They Can Work Better in a Chaotic World (2021).

Early life and education
Moyo was born in 1969 in Lusaka, Zambia. She spent some of her childhood in the United States, while her father was pursuing his post graduate education, then returned to Zambia. 

She studied chemistry at the University of Zambia, and completed her BS in chemistry in 1991 at American University in Washington, D.C. via a scholarship. She received an MBA in finance from the university in 1993. 

She acquired a Master of Public Administration (MPA) degree at Harvard University's John F. Kennedy School of Government in 1997. In 2002 she received a DPhil in economics from St Antony's College, Oxford University.

Career

World Bank and Goldman Sachs
Following her MBA, Moyo worked at the World Bank from May 1993 to September 1995. She was a consultant in the bank's Europe, Central Asia and Africa departments, and co-authored the World Bank's annual World Development Report.

After pursuing her MPA and PhD, Moyo joined Goldman Sachs as a research economist and strategist in 2001. She was with the company until November 2008, working mainly in debt capital markets, hedge funds coverage, and global macroeconomics. Part of her tenure at Goldman Sachs was spent advising developing countries on the issuing of bonds on the international market. She was also head of economic research and strategy for sub-Saharan Africa.

Board memberships
After leaving Goldman Sachs, Moyo joined the board of directors of the international brewer SABMiller in 2009. She is also a former board member of Barclays Bank, the international mining company Barrick Gold, and the data storage company Seagate Technology.

As of 2022, she is on the boards of Chevron Corporation, 3M Company. and Condé Nast.

Moyo is also a former board member of the charities Lundin for Africa and Room to Read. 

She is a member of the World Economic Forum's Global Agenda Council on Global Economic Imbalances, and the Bretton Woods Committee.

Journalism and public speaking
Moyo is a public speaker, commentator, and columnist. She has written for international financial and economic journals, periodicals, and publications, including The Wall Street Journal, Financial Times, The New York Times, and Time.

She has lectured at financial and economic summits, forums, and conferences, including the annual World Economic Forum conference in Davos, the Council on Foreign Relations, the American Enterprise Institute, the annual Bilderberg Conference, the Peterson Institute for International Economics, the Organisation for Economic Co-operation and Development (OECD), the Aspen Institute, and the Ambrosetti Forum. She also speaks at venues including TEDTalks and BBCs HARDtalk, and is a commentator on business-news television networks.

It was announced on 14 October 2022, that as part of the 2022 Special Honours, Moyo would receive a life peerage. On 8 November 2022, she was created Baroness Moyo, of Knightsbridge in the City of Westminster.

Awards and honors
 World Economic Forum Young Global Leader (2009)
 Time 100 (2009)
 Oprah Winfrey's O First-Ever Power List (2009)
 Hayek Lifetime Achievement Award (2013)
 GQ and Editorial Intelligences The 100 Most Connected Women (2014)
 Handelsblatts 25 Great Thinkers (2015)
Evening Standard: London's Most Influential People (2015), (2016), (2017)

Books

Dead Aid
Moyo's first book, Dead Aid: Why Aid Is Not Working and How There is Another Way for Africa (2009), became a New York Times bestseller. It argues that government-to-government foreign aid has harmed Africa and should be phased out. In the book she states that in the past 50 years, more than $1 trillion in development-related aid has been transferred from rich countries to Africa, and questions whether anything has changed. 

The book suggests that official development assistance (ODA), as opposed to humanitarian aid, perpetuates the cycle of poverty and hinders economic growth in Africa. It offers developing countries proposals for financial development instead of relying on foreign government-to-government aid.

The Financial Times summarized the book's argument, stating "Limitless development assistance to African governments, [Moyo] argues, has fostered dependency, encouraged corruption and ultimately perpetuated poor governance and poverty."

How the West Was Lost
Moyo's second book, How the West Was Lost: Fifty Years of Economic Folly – And the Stark Choices that Lie Ahead (2011), became a New York Times bestseller, debuting at No. 6.

In a review in The Observer, Paul Collier wrote that "her diagnosis of the recent disasters in financial markets is succinct and sophisticated". The Guardian stated, "How the West Was Lost is more interesting, wider in scale and more important than Dead Aid' It went on to state "Moyo is a very orthodox thinker, unable to consider a world beyond free markets and underpriced resources and blind to the social effects of what she proposes and celebrates"."

Similarly, Alan Beattie of the Financial Times wrote, "The challenges it identifies are for the most part real, if not original. But the huge flaws of the emerging economies are ignored." The Economist said "these arguments need much better supporting material than the book provides".

Winner Take All
Moyo's third book, Winner Take All: China's Race for Resources and What It Means for the World (2012), examines global commodity dynamics over the next several decades, specifically China's massive global rush for natural resources including hard commodities (metals and minerals) and soft commodities (timber and food). It predicts the financial and geopolitical implications of a world of diminishing resources, and argues that China is already well on the way to gaining the upper hand in world economic dominance.Winner Take All became a New York Times bestseller. A review in the Financial Times stated that "If Dambisa Moyo is right, the demands of the world's most populous state are bad news for the rest of us. ... One cannot accuse Moyo of failing to do her homework." The Telegraph commented "Moyo thinks [China's impact on the global commodity market] will go on and on, powered by an unstoppable Chinese economy. Perhaps she is right, but the grounds for doubting whether the future will be a straight line from the past deserve a hearing."

How Boards Work: And How They Can Work Better in a Chaotic World
Moyo's fifth book, How Boards Work: And How They Can Work Better in a Chaotic World was released in 2021. It provides an insider's perspective of corporate boards, reassesses the three-part board mandate, and calls for more transparent, knowledgeable, and diverse boards to steer companies through 21st-century challenges. The Financial Times stated that the book would be  "highly instructive for aspiring non-executives" and provided "thoughtful analysis and reform proposals against which boardroom sophisticates can usefully test their assumptions".

Personal life
In December 2020 Moyo married billionaire Jared Smith, co-founder of Utah-based cloud computing company Qualtrics.

BibliographyDead Aid: Why Aid Is Not Working and How There Is a Better Way for Africa (2009)  How the West Was Lost: Fifty Years of Economic Folly – And the Stark Choices that Lie Ahead (2011) Winner Take All: China's Race for Resources and What It Means for the World (2012) Edge of Chaos: Why Democracy Is Failing to Deliver Economic Growthand How to Fix It (2018) How Boards Work: And How They Can Work Better in a Chaotic World'' (2021)

References

External links

 
 
 
 

1969 births
Living people
Zambian women economists
Zambian economists
Harvard Kennedy School alumni
Alumni of St Antony's College, Oxford
American University alumni
Goldman Sachs people
World Bank people
Zambian expatriates in the United Kingdom
Zambian women writers
Kogod School of Business alumni
Barclays people
20th-century Zambian writers
21st-century Zambian writers
20th-century Zambian women writers
21st-century Zambian women writers
People from Lusaka
Life peers created by Charles III
Life peeresses created by Charles III
Conservative Party (UK) life peers
Black British politicians
Black British women politicians